Honor is a smartphone brand majority owned by a state-owned enterprise controlled by the municipal government of Shenzhen. It was formerly owned by Huawei Technologies. Honor provides smartphones, but has also released tablet computers and wearable technology.

In 2016, George Zhao was global president of Honor. In November 2020, Honor was acquired by Shenzhen Zhixin New Information Technology Co. Ltd.

History 

Honor was founded in 2013 as a Huawei sub-brand. Honor's line of smartphones allowed Huawei to compete with mid-range online smartphone brands in China and globally. Honor primarily sells products online, but some Honor products are also available at stores in selected markets.

In November 2020, the Honor brand was sold to Shenzhen Zhixin New Information Technology, a majority state-owned company controlled by the Shenzhen municipal government, to "ensure" its then-parent company, Huawei's survival, due to US sanctions against them. U.S. sanctions restricted the sale of hardware components to Huawei by American firms.

Timeline of international expansion 
Honor began to offer its products internationally in 2014, launching the Honor 3C in April in Malaysia, followed by the Honor 6 in Europe in October. By June 2015, the brand was available in 74 countries. In October that year, announced to increase revenue to $5 billion with plans to focus on India.

In 2015, Honor's Vmall online store, previously available only in China, launched in Europe and the United Kingdom, enabling direct purchases from the manufacturer.

Honor made its debut in the United States with the release of the Huawei Honor 5X at the Consumer Electronics Show (CES) in January 2016. Initially available for online purchase only, the Huawei Honor 5X was later made available at select brick and mortar stores. Also this year Honor started to sell the first fitness-trackers.

In August 2016, Recode reported that Honor had sold over 60 million products, generating over $8.4 billion in revenue.

In January 2017 at CES, Honor announced that the Honor 6X, previously available only in China, would be available in thirteen new markets, including the United States. The phone earned "best of CES 2017" accolades from several technology publications, including Android Authority, Digital Trends, Slash Gear, and Talk Android.

In 2018 Honor started to sell laptops and smartwatches, in 2019 earbuds and TVs.

On 21 January 2021, Honor launched their first non-Huawei phone, the V40, after the dip in production of Honor devices caused by the removal of Google's Android mobile operating system after US sanctions, and a lack of support from Huawei's R&D division.

References

External links 

 

Huawei Honor
Huawei
Government-owned companies of China